Bruce Gordon (born 4 February 1929 in Surry Hills, New South Wales) is an Australian businessman. He is the owner of the Australian television network, WIN Television through his ownership of WIN Corporation, the largest shareholder of Network 10 & the largest shareholder of the Nine Network, and holds a significant stake in Nine Entertainment Co.

Career 
From humble beginning, Gordon juggled fruit to lure customers into his father's street-side fruit stall. He continued to hone his magic skills into his 20s and gained his first performance at Sydney's Tivoli circuit theatre; later progressing onto management of the theatre. During this period he got to know Rupert Murdoch, Sir Frank Packer and his sons, Kerry and Clyde, and Bruce Gyngell.

In 1962, Gordon was appointed the Australasian sales executive for Desilu Productions, which was sold to Gulf and Western, which renamed the studio Paramount Television. Gordon worked as a programming executive for Paramount in Hollywood for thirty years.

Gordon gained control of Television Wollongong Transmission Ltd (later rebadged as WIN TV) in 1979 from Murdoch. He then expanded WIN Television's operations during the 1990s, buying out the other shareholders in 1991 after buying two licences in Queensland and Crawford Productions. By the end of the decade WIN had licences and transmitters in all Australian states and mainland territories (except NT).

Gordon holds a 50% share in the NRL St. George Illawarra Dragons club through WIN Corporation.

Personal life
Gordon lives in Bermuda with his second wife, Judith, with additional residences in Sydney and Monaco. Gordon has a son, Andrew, and a daughter, Genevieve.

In 2021, the Australian Financial Review assessed Gordon's net worth at 870 million. Gordon is one of eleven living Australians who have appeared on every Rich List, since it was first published in 1984.

Wealth rankings

References

1929 births
Living people
Australian chairpersons of corporations
Australian chief executives
Australian mass media owners
Businesspeople from Sydney
People from Wollongong
Australian expatriates in Bermuda